Perquie is a commune, a small town located in the Landes department in Nouvelle-Aquitaine (the Aquitaine region) in southwestern France.

Population
The inhabitants of Perquie are called the Perquois and the Perquoises.
The 350 inhabitants (2017) of the village of Perquie live on a total surface of 26 km2 with a density of 13 inhabitants per km2 and an average altitude of 90 m.

Geography
The neighboring towns are Villeneuve-de-Marsan at 2.42 km, Arthez-d'Armagnac at 3.03 km, Saint-Gein at 4.84 km, Pujo-le-Plan at 4.45 km, Hontanx at 6.04 km. The nearest large town of Perquie is Mont-de-Marsan and is 17.55 kilometers south as the crow flies. The nearest train station to Perquie is in Mont-de-Marsan (17.78 kilometers). The present mayor of Perquie is Jean-Yves Arrestat.

Attractions
 Le Château de Ravignan
The castle of Ravignan,  is a Louis XIII style residence, located in the commune of Perquie in France, surrounded by a park. The structure is surrounded by formal gardens and woodlands. The present building was constructed on the ruins of a medieval castle in 1663.  It has been designated as a 'monument historique' by the French Ministry of Culture. The château's cellars have produced Armagnac brandy for more than three centuries. Inside the building is listed on the Historical Monuments, furniture, and antique objects, costumes of the eighteenth century, as well as a collection of drawings and engravings representing Henry IV.

 Animal park of Nahuques
With free admission, this park lets children play around, where they can also see animals like goats, sheep, Corsican mouflons, llamas, deer, emus, and swans.

 Arènes de Plumaçon
The Plumaçon arenas were built in 1889 and enlarged in 1933 by the architect Franck Bonnefous. This aficionado will unveil the secrets of the Plumaçon arenas. The arena contains 7,000 seats.

 Despiau-Wlérick Museum
The Musée Despiau Wlérick, is a tourist attraction in the area. It's located near Mont-de-Marsan. The museum has modern figurative designs, which presents 1800 artworks of sculptures from 1880 till 1950.

Economic
The number of working people in 2013 was 220 (men and women), at the age of 15 to 64 years old. Of which 169 people were active and 52 were inactive.  The classification of active people was defined between employed- and unemployed people, and the inactive categories were retirement, study reason and also other reason for being inactive.

See also
Communes of the Landes department

References

Communes of Landes (department)